Thu Riya (born Thura Lynn on 6 May 1989) is a Burmese actor, model, television presenter, and a comedian. He has starred in over 40 films in his acting career.

Early life and education
Thuriya was born on 6 May 1989 in Bago, Bago Region, Myanmar. He is the eldest son of Kyi Linn and Cho Cho Mar, proprietors of Sein Bayek traditional medicine production. He is the eldest of four siblings, having two younger brothers, Aung Thu Linn and Chan Pyae Pyae Linn and a younger sister Khin Thissa Kyi.

Thuriya started his schooling at the Basic Education High School No. 3 Bago, till 9th grade and moved to Yangon to attend the Basic Education High School No. 1 Dagon.  He then enrolled at the Institute of Myanmar Traditional Medicine, Mandalay in 2005 and graduated with a Dip.T.Med. in 2008 and then relocated to Yangon to help out in his parents’ family business.

Career

Beginnings

Thuriya's first appearance in television was in 1997, in the advertisement of his parents’ Sein Bayek traditional medicine house. He began his acting career as a child and performed in many Myanmar history films. Due to his schooling, he was not able to contribute fully in the acting career, but occasionally he participated in many entertainments of school concerts and educational films.

In 2009, permission was granted by his parents to enter into the field of acting, which is the focus of his life, since his childhood.

2010–2013: Acting debut and breakthrough

Thuriya's acting debut was a supporting role in 2010 in Myawaddy TV’s short films. Through these experiences, he became connected with Myanmar films enterprise and performed in supporting roles in many films and soon gained recognition by the audiences. He also acted in some music videos.

In 2011, he entered into a five-year contract with Mahogany Film and Video Production and made his acting debut in the film A-Mi Me Tha (Motherless son) and changed his name from Thura Linn to Thuriya.

In 2013, Thuriya was in a dispute with Mahogany due to the very heavy indemnity, he was deterred from making any films or performing any acts with any other productions during the contract period with Mahogany film production. At that time, he was also not in good terms with his family and had disappeared from his home and the film industry for a period of two years.

2016–present: Breaking into the big screen
In 2016, Thuriya starred in the Big screen feature film Facebook Ywa (Facebook Village). The film  was produced by Aung Thiri Production, and screened in Myanmar cinemas in 2016, and was considered a big success, with full houses in the movie theatres.

During 2016–2017, Thuriya was cast in TV series of MRTV-4, one of the Myanmar national TV stations. He was involved in Ma Nay Ka Phit Thi (It was on Yesterday) and Pyin Salat Ywar (Magic Village), produced by MRTV 4’s Taurus Production.

In 2018, the video markets crumpled, so he then again shifted back to the film industry. He has continued making films and these films will be released in 2019. He has been acting in three big screen films and over 40 direct-to-video films in his acting career.

Changing appearance
In 2017, Thuriya underwent plastic surgery at DRK Beauty Clinic in Bangkok, Thailand, to reduce fat from his cheeks. His looks changed from puffy cheeks to V-shaped.

Business
Thuriya is also a practitioner of Burmese traditional medicine. He owns Thuriya Myanmar Traditional Medicine, a producer of Burmese traditional medicine.

Personal life

Thuriya relationship with actress Hsu Eaint San, who was a co-star on the film "Facebook Ywar", became a publicized topic in the Cele Cele Small Facebook page. After this  news was released, they couple admitted to the public on their relationship had started on early 2017.  In October 2019, they faced some problem and end their relationship.

Thuriya and Hsu Eaint San co-starred in many more films most notably Kya Phyu, Naung Be Daw Mha Ma Mohn, and Shin A-May Ne Kyaun-ma, as well as big screen films, Facebook Ywa, Nga Academy and Thaye Thinbaw.

Filmography

Mahogany Videos Production (Direct-to-Videos)
Thuriya has starred in several direct-to-video films in association with Mahogany Videos Productions since 2011. The following is a partial list.

Aung Thiri Videos Production (Direct-to-Videos)
Thuriya has been starring again in direct-to-videos with Aung Thiri Videos Production on 2015. Following are the lists of his works but it may not be the complete lists.

Films (Cinema)

MRTV-4 Tarus V Production (Television series)
In 2016–2017, Thuriya began starring in a film series with the MRTV-4 Tarus V Production.

References

External links

Official website

Burmese male film actors
1989 births
Living people
Burmese comedians
Burmese male models
21st-century Burmese male singers
Burmese television presenters
People from Bago Region
21st-century Burmese male actors